El Nacional is a Venezuelan publishing company under the name C.A. Editorial El Nacional, most widely known for its El Nacional newspaper and website. It, along with Últimas Noticias and El Universal, are the most widely read and circulated daily national newspapers in the country. In 2010, it had an average of 83,000 papers distributed daily and 170,000 copies on weekends.

Since the increase of censorship in Venezuela during the presidencies of Hugo Chávez and Nicolás Maduro, El Nacional has been described as one of the last independent newspapers in Venezuela.

El Nacional published its final print edition on 14 December 2018 (after having been cut to five print editions per week back in August), joining in the dozens of anti-government newspapers in the nation that have stopped printing due to paper and toner shortages. It became an exclusively online newspaper after the date.

Contributors and owners
El Nacional was founded in August 1943 in Caracas by Miguel Otero Silva and is directed by Chief Editorial Officer Miguel Henrique Otero, grandson of the founder, and by Chief Executive Officer Manuel Sucre.

The newspaper's first director was poet Antonio Arráiz (1903–1962). In the newspaper have contributed many of the most recognized Venezuelan writers. Arturo Úslar Pietri, one of the most important intellectuals of the country, wrote for more than fifty years in an opinion column in the newspaper. Former editors include José Ramón Medina and Miguel Otero Silva.

History 
In 1961, an advertising boycott in opposition to the paper's leftist views (its then editor, Miguel Otero Silva, had been a member of the Communist Party of Venezuela) nearly forced the paper into bankruptcy.

Historically, the newspaper received criticism by the governments under the AD and COPEI parties for it had tended to support the political beliefs of the moderate left and the middle class.

In late 2007 editor and proprietor Miguel Henrique Otero founded the Movimiento 2D opposition movement, which supported the opposition electoral coalition Mesa de la Unidad Democrática in the September 2010 parliamentary election.

Attacks
On 14 April 2018, government-sponsored colectivos attacked the headquarters of El Nacional, kidnapping security workers and a janitor. Weeks after the Venezuelan presidential election in 2018, the newspaper had their Hypertext Transfer Protocol momentarily censored by the state-run CANTV from 7 June to 11 June 2018.

The newspaper has since had its website continuously censored in Venezuela, being described as one of the last independent media organizations in Venezuela. After the government pressed charges against El Nacional, proposing the payment of a fine of 1 billion bolívares, Bolivarian government official Diosdado Cabello replied to the newspaper's publishing of Venezuela's hyperinflation figures stating "if it was a billion bolívares, let's ... put five zeros next to it". Cabello targeted the newspaper even further, stating in late-September 2018 that he sought to acquire the newspaper's headquarters and convert it into a university.

References

External links
  
 

Spanish-language newspapers
Venezuelan news websites
Newspapers published in Venezuela
Publications established in 1943
Book publishing companies of Venezuela
Spanish-language websites
Media of the Crisis in Venezuela